A.E. Kifisia F.C. is a Greek professional football club based in Kifisia, Athens, Greece. Founded in 2012 after the merger of A.O. Kifisia and A.O.K. Elpidoforos. They compete in the Super League 2, the second tier of Greek football.

Players

Current squad

History

The first years of the new club 

A.E. Kifisia F.C. was founded in 2012 after the merge of A.O. Kifisia and A.O.K. Elpidoforos so that the area of Kifissia has a competitive club that actively participates in the national categories.

In its first season  2012–13 as a newly formed club participated in the 8th Group of the 4th National Division, essentially taking the place of Elpidoforos, that finished in 2nd place with 42 points behind A.O. Egaleo and won the promotion to the then newly formed, after the merge of the professional 3rd Division Men's football and the amateur 4th Division Men's. They also won the cup  EPSA 2012–13 from A.O. Egaleo at the stadium of Nea Smyrni, 1-1 during the regular season and 4–3 on penalties. In this match, an original scene prevailed on the stands as there were fans of Kifissia of Egaleo and Panionios, with the latter supporting the team of the northern suburbs.

The next three years were the worst for the team of Kifisia. In the period 2015-2016, their participation again in the 4th group of the 3rd division was essentially their first period that risked relegation after finishing one position above the relegation zone, specifically in 9th place and with 5 points difference from the 10th Asteras Varis. In the 2016-2017 season (3rd Division) they risked even more than the previous year after finishing 3 points above the relegation zone, while at the same time he reached again the semifinal phase of the 3rd division Cup from where they were knocked out by Achaiki in a penalty shootout that ended 5-4. The relegation of Kifisia finally came in the 2017–18 season (3rd Division) where they finished with 21 points in the 9th place of the 4th group of the 3rd division, 5 points less than the salvation of the 7th place. Kifisia was mathematically relegated in the penultimate game after the 5-0 away defeat by OF Ierapetra. Despite its relegation, in the same period Kifissia won once again the EPSA cup 2017–18, defeating this time 2-0 Agia Paraskevi at the Municipal Stadium of Peristeri.

In the next period of 2018-19, they easily won the championship of the A Division of EPSA with only one defeat in 30 matches and returned to the national categories.

The next season (2019-20) in the 3rd division they finished with 36 points in 26 games in the 4th place of the 5th group of the category.

The promotion that Kifisia was looking for in the last decade was finally achieved in the period 2020-21 where with 12 wins and just one defeat they won the first place of the 7th group with a difference of 8 points. It is worth noting that during that season, only the first round of the league was held due to the Coronavirus Pandemic. After winning the first place, Kifisia qualified for the promotion playoffs for the then newly formed Super League 2, where he made the absolute with 4 in 4 victories against Panionios, Zakynthos, Thyella Rafinas and Herodotus of Nea Alikarnassos with 0 passive goals in its first promotion in its history in the second national football category of Greece.

Kifisia in the professional divisions 

The maiden participation of Kifisia in the professional categories was highly successful. In the Greek Cup, eliminating Apollon Smyrnis, they advanced to the round of 16 stage where they were drawn with AEK Athens. In the first game in OAKA, they lost with 4-0, but in the second leg, Kifisia managed to draw 1-1. In the league, Kifisia finished 6th in a group of 17 teams, even though they played away from home due to construction work at Zirineio Stadium. At the same time, the newely established U20 team of A.E. Kifisia reached the final of the U20 Super League 2, where they were defeated by A.O Egaleo U20, in a relatively controversial game, with 1-2.

Facilities

Ground 
 The Ground of Kifisia FC is the Municipal Stadium of Kifissia "Zirineio", which is located at 192 Kifissias Avenue. Zirineio has two concrete stands along the stadium. The main (North) stand of Zirineio has a capacity of around 1050 seats while the guest stand (South) around 300 seats. With the promotion of Kifisia in Super League 2, renovation work was done so that Zirineio to be able to host professional level matches. After 30 years, the existing turf will be removed and a new natural one will be installed, with faster regrowth and greater durability. Among the projects that are planned is the placement of seats in the stands, new fencing, the addition of commentary booths, and construction of an extension of the south stand with an additional 300-400 seats. Work on the construction of the stadium began in 1929 and was completed in May 1932 at a total cost of 4,000,000 drachmas. During this time they stopped temporarily due to disagreements over its name, because at that time, stadiums were not named after individuals. Thus, Zirineio became the first stadium in Greece with the name of an individual person. A.E. Kifisia F.C. currently uses the Kaisariani Municipal Stadium “Michalis Kritikopoulos”, with a capacity of 4,851, as a home ground due to the renovation work taking place in Zirineio.

Training Facilities 
 Kifisia is one of the few amateur teams with a privately owned training center. Specifically, the training center of AE Kifisia is a property of AO Elpidoforos that passed to AE Kifisia with its merge with A.O. Kifisia, so the facilities are known as "Stadium of Elpidoforos." After the concession of the training center to A.E. Kifisia F.C., a plastic turf was installed and the surrounding railings were repaired. Generally, the training center is constantly upgraded. The training center of Kifisia houses the academies which are considered one of the largest in the region of Attica, with repeated appearances in the final phases of EPSA championships and continuous promotions of players in the respective departments of professional clubs.

Supporters and Rivalries

Supporters 
Kifisia has a relatively small amount of supporters which are mostly from the northern part of Athens. There are two different supporters' groups of the club which actively attend games and show their support for the club, "KIFISSIA ULTRAS" and "Northistas Club". 

"KIFISSIA ULTRAS" or "Σύνδεσμος Φιλάθλων Κηφισιάς", are the main supporters' group of the club. The group is made up of supporters coming from Southern Kifisia, Northern Kifisia, Central Kifisia, Nea Kifisia, Nea Erythrea, and Ekali. Most fans come from the ultras group "Jokers", of AENK B.C. in Nea Kifisia, from older A.O.K. Elpidoforos supporters, but also from other local ultras groups. "KIFISSIA ULTRAS" share friendships with "Drosia Ultras Gate 3" and "Raptors Nea Erythrea Club". Due to various reasons, the group is not active anymore and rarely attends games.

Rivalries
A.E. Kifisia F.C.'s main football rivals are smaller Athens football clubs like Kallithea F.C., Egaleo F.C., Fostiras F.C., Apollon Smyrnis F.C., Proodeftiki F.C., and more. The supporters' rivals are Pefki, Maroussi, Colonos, Irakleio, and Elefsina.

Course Over the Years

Honours

Domestic
 Fourth Division League Champions: 1
 2020–21
 Athens FCA League Champions: 1
 2018–19
 Athens FCA Cup Winners: 3
 1990–91, 2012–13, 2017–18

References

 
Football clubs in Attica
Super League Greece 2 clubs